Paul Wallace Gates (December 14, 1901 – January 5, 1999) was a professor of history and general historian who is widely considered to be the foremost authority on the history of federal land policy in the United States.  Gates wrote 10 books and 75 academic articles, and his magnum opus was History of Public Land Law Development.

Life and career

Gates was born in Nashua, New Hampshire, son of a Protestant minister.  His undergraduate work was chiefly at Colby College (B.S., 1924), although he also attended Clark University (A.M., 1925) and the University of Wisconsin.  He earned his PhD from Harvard University in 1930, working under the direction of Frederick Merk.  Gates' PhD thesis was the basis of his first book, The Illinois Central Railroad and Its Colonization Work (1934), for which he was awarded the David A. Wells Prize at Harvard.  Gates was an instructor at Harvard (1929-1930) while working on his doctorate, and after receiving his PhD he worked for the Agricultural Adjustment Administration, and taught at Bucknell University (1930-1936).

In 1935 Gates began his career at Cornell University, where he did the majority of his academic work.  From 1946 to 1956 he was the Chair of the Department of History.  He eventually earned the honor of being named the John Stambaugh Professor of History.  Aside from his research, he was a renowned professor of undergraduate courses and had 23 PhD students, many of whom became leaders in the profession as well.  He emphasized with these students interdisciplinary studies, a characteristic of Gates himself.  After he retired in 1971, he continued writing many seminal works on the subject of land law and well into his 90s was still being honored as the foremost leader in this field.

Gates wrote on many separate regions, with a focus on the upper Midwest and California.  Although his early career interests were in federal land policy in general, as he himself once said, "It soon became apparent that before a history of the Public Domain could be written, special and regional studies would have to be prepared to show the functioning of the land system in a number of fairly typical states and smaller subdivisions."

Gates was married for over 60 years to Lillian Cowdell Gates, who had an independent academic career and also collaborated with Paul on several books.  They had 4 children and 17 grandchildren.  After Lillian died, Paul remarried.  He died in Oakland, California, where he had lived briefly late in his retirement.  Among the honorary degrees that he received were the hon. L.H.D. from Colby College (1967), and the hon. LL.D. from the University of Maine (1968).

Bibliography

In addition to the references above, the following selected list of works is provided since his writings define who Gates was.  Most of these works are by Gates but some of them are about Gates.

Books and other monographs

 
 
  Reprint edition available for sale October 31, 2013.

Journal articles

References

Sources

External links

1901 births
1999 deaths
Historians of the United States
Colby College alumni
Harvard University alumni
Cornell University Department of History faculty
Presidents of the Mississippi Valley Historical Association
20th-century American historians
American male non-fiction writers
20th-century American male writers